LDO may refer to:

 Limited duty officer
 Low-dropout regulator
 London Designer Outlet, a shopping centre in London